Neduvannoor is a village situated near Pathanapuram in Kollam District in the Indian state of Kerala.

Politics
Neduvannoor is a part of Pathanapuram assembly constituency in Mavelikkara (Lok Sabha constituency). K. B. Ganesh Kumar is the current MLA of Pathanpuram. Kodikkunnil Suresh is the current member of parliament of Mavelikkara.

The Indian National Congress (INC), the Communist Party of India (Marxist) (CPM), Kerala Congress (B) and BJP are the major political parties.

Geography
Neduvannoor is a small village in Thalavoor panchayats. Neduvannoor is a junction in [Pathanapuram-Kottarakkara road. It connects Avaneeswaram and other places. Neduvannoor (Avaneeswaram) bridge is a main landmark of Manchalloor.

Demographics
Malayalam is the native language of Neduvannoor.

References

Geography of Kollam district
Villages in Kollam district